Gravissimum educationis is the Second Vatican Council's Declaration on Christian Education.  It was promulgated on 28 October 1965 by Pope Paul VI, following approval by the assembled bishops by a vote of 2,290 to 35.

Description
The document is generally referred to, not by its English-language title, "Declaration on Christian Education", but by the opening words of its original Latin text, which mean "extremely important education".

The document quotes at length from Divini illius Magistri (That divine teacher, 1929) by Pope Pius XI.

Contents
 Introduction
 The Meaning of the Universal Right to an Education
 Christian Education
 The Authors of Education
 Various Aids to Christian Education
 The Importance of Schools
 The Duties and Rights of Parents
 Moral and Religious Education in All Schools
 Catholic Schools
 Different Types of Catholic Schools
 Catholic Colleges and Universities
 Faculties of Sacred Sciences
 Coordination to be Fostered in Scholastic Matters
 Conclusion

Parents as primary educators
"Since parents have given children their life, they are bound by the most serious obligation to educate their offspring and therefore must be recognized as the primary and principal educators. This role in education is so important that only with difficulty can it be supplied where it is lacking. Parents are the ones who must create a family atmosphere animated by love and respect for God and man, in which the well-rounded personal and social education of children is fostered. Hence the family is the first school of the social virtues that every society needs."

Gravissimum Educationis Foundation 
On October 28, 2015, Pope Francis founded the Gravissimum Educationis Foundation intended to further scientific and cultural objectives aimed at promoting Catholic education in the world.

The Foundation consists of: the President and the Vice President; the Board of Directors; the Secretary-General; the Treasurer; the Scientific Committee; the Assembly of Sponsors; the Board of Auditors.

The Foundation is a not-for-profit, and pursues scientific and cultural aims to promote Catholic education in the world. In particular, the Foundation is committed to: the promotion of research, studies and publications on the thought of the Church as it concerns Catholic education and culture at the school and university levels; the support and organization of conferences and international scientific events on specific issues and projects; to award institutions and scholars who have distinguished themselves in their scientific activity and/or research as it relates to Catholic education and culture; networking and collaboration between educational institutions with regard to management training and qualification and to communication of new scientific discoveries and research; the strengthening of relationships and cooperation between international organizations and institutions dedicated to education.

See also

:Category:Catholic schools by country
:Category:Roman Catholic schools by continent
Catholic education
Catholic university
Ex Corde Ecclesiae
Parochial school

References

External links
English translation of Gravissimum educationis
Gravissimum Educationis Foundation

Decrees
Documents of the Second Vatican Council
Latin texts
1965 documents
1965 in Christianity